Events in the year 1946 in Norway.

Incumbents
 Monarch – Haakon VII
 Prime Minister – Einar Gerhardsen (Labour Party)

Events

1 February – Trygve Lie is selected as the first United Nations Secretary General
6 December – The Home Guard was established.
 Årdal og Sunndal Verk is established as a state-run corporation with the task of finishing unfinished industrial facilities started by the German occupational forces.

Popular culture

Sports

Godtfred Holmvang, decathlete and skier, is awarded the Egebergs Ærespris, for athletes who excel in more than one sport.

Music

Film

Literature

Notable births

January 
 
8 January – Åse Klundelien, politician
10 January – Bernhard Riksfjord, politician
17 January – Finn Kristian Marthinsen, politician
18 January – Herbjørn Skogstad, illustrator.
20 January – Lisbeth Holand, politician
21 January – Bjørn Skogstad Aamo, economist and politician
22 January – Svein Kristensen, civil servant
31 January – Knut Lystad, actor, singer, translator, screenwriter, comedian and director

February 
 
1 February – Øystein Rottem, philologist, literary historian and literary critic (died 2004)
2 February – Lasse Qvigstad, jurist
4 February – Anders Talleraas, politician
8 February – Karin Kjølmoen, politician
11 February – Knut Vollebæk, diplomat and politician
12 February
Ingrid Hadler, orienteer and World Champion
Ulf Thoresen, harness racer (died 1992)
17 February – Helge Jordal, actor and singer
18 February – Torny Pedersen, politician
19 February – Tore Schei, Chief Justice of the Supreme Court of Norway
20 February – Ole Nafstad, rower and Olympic silver medallist
21 February 
Marianne Heske, visual artist.
Knut Hove, veterinarian
24 February – Sverre Stub, diplomat

March 
 
4 March – Harald Rensvik, civil servant
5 March
Klaus Hagerup, author, translator, screenwriter, actor and director
Oddvar Stenstrøm, journalist and television host
9 March – Britt Harkestad, politician
14 March – Knut Hanselmann, politician
16 March – Sigmund Groven, classical harmonica player
19 March – Roar Grønvold, speed skater and Olympic silver medallist
21 March – Svein Sturla Hungnes, actor, theatre director and instructor
23 March – Jon Reinertsen, handball player
28 March – Marianne Gullestad, social anthropologist (died 2008)

April 
 
8 April – Åge Korsvold, businessperson
10 April – Erling Kittelsen, poet, novelist, children's writer, playwright and translator.
18 April – Per Erik Monsen, politician (died 2008)
21 April – Inge Hansen, handball player
27 April – Tanja Heiberg Storm, diplomat (died 2023).
30 April – Lars Vikør, linguist

May 
 
4 May – Gunnar Jordfald, civil servant
5 May – Svend Wam, film director
16 May 
Laila Stien, novelist, poet and translator.
Olav Anton Thommessen, composer
Willy Ustad, novelist
18 May – Liv Sandven, politician
21 May
Pål Bye, handball player
Arne Fliflet, jurist and civil servant
23 May – Åge Starheim, politician

June 
 
10 June – Sverre J. Hoddevik, politician
11 June 
Gunn Imsen, educationalist
Jan Petersen, politician and Minister
13 June – Rune Gerhardsen, politician and sports leader (died 2021).
21 June
Trond Kirkvaag, comedian, actor, imitator, screenwriter, author, director and television host (died 2007)
Harald Norvik, businessperson
23 June – Svein Thøgersen, rower and Olympic silver medallist.

July 
 

11 July – Kim Traavik, diplomat and politician.
12 July – Bernt Bull, politician and organizational leader.
13 July – Jon Westborg, diplomat.
18 July
Gerd Dvergsdal, politician
Bjørn Kjos, aviator, lawyer, and business magnate.
Svein Ludvigsen, politician and Minister
Victor D. Norman, economist and politician.
19 July – Odd L. Fosseidbråten, civil servant and diplomat.
22 July – Jan Grund, academic

August 
 

2 August – Ivar Frønes, sociologist
4 August – Ola Dybwad-Olsen, international soccer player
7 August – Øystein Hedstrøm, politician.
13 August – Arild Underdal, political scientist.
14 August 
Bjørn Kruse, composer.
Gunn Vigdis Olsen-Hagen, politician (died 1989)
15 August – Tone Danielsen, actress.
18 August – Arild Braastad, diplomat

September 
 

5 September – Sigurd Allern, media theorist and professor of journalism
8 September – Arent M. Henriksen, politician.
15 September – Bente Sætrang, textile artist.
16 September – Trond Bergh, economic historian
23 September – John Haugland, rally driver
28 September – Tarald Osnes Brautaset, diplomat
29 September – Tove Strand, civil servant and politician

October 
7 October – Svein Aaser, businessperson
13 October – Sven-Erik Svedman, diplomat and politician
22 October – Eirik Glenne, diplomat
27 October – Steinar Gullvåg, politician
28 October – Per Rom, sprinter
31 October – Jo Inge Bjørnebye, ski jumper (died 2013).

November 
 
1 November – Jørgen Åsland, politician
7 November 
Sten Egil Bjørnø, politician
 Anne Marit Jacobsen, actress.
9 November – Gunnar Fatland, politician
18 November – Ulf Magnussen, handball player
23 November – Agnes Buen Garnås, traditional folk singer
25 November – Harald Tyrdal, handball player

December 
 
7 December 
Haakon Baardsøn Hjelde, diplomat
Kirsti Sparboe, singer and actress
Lars Wilhelmsen, civil servant
11 December
Torbjørn Frøysnes, diplomat and politician
Dagfinn Sundsbø, politician
14 December – Ingse Stabel, judge
24 December – Vigdis Moe Skarstein, librarian.
29 December – Bernhard Ramstad, actor, theatre instructor and director

Full date unknown
Olav Terje Bergo, newspaper editor
Svein Koningen, painter
Torleiv Maseng, engineer
Oddbjørn Nordset, civil servant and politician
Arvid Noe, sailor and truck driver, one of the first non-Africans known to have died from AIDS (died 1976)
Arne Nore, businessperson

Notable deaths
 

8 January – Rasmus Pedersen Thu, photographer (born 1864)
23 January – Bernt Tunold, painter (born 1877)
13 February – Johan Throne Holst, industrialist and politician (born 1868)
22 March – Ragnvald Bødtker, engineer (born 1859)
23 March – Ingolf Davidsen, gymnast and Olympic silver medallist (born 1893)
4 April – Klaus Sletten, organizational worker, editor and politician (born 1877)
30 April – Olav Gunnarsson Helland, Hardanger fiddle maker (born 1875)
5 May – Theodor Dahl, journalist and fiction writer (born 1886).
16 May – Søren Berg Sørensen Moen, politician (born 1899)
29 June – Edle Hartmann, writer (born 1862).
21 August – Rudolf Gundersen, speed skater (born 1879)
16 September – Margit Schiøtt, politician (born 1889)
13 October – Ole Sæther, rifle shooter and Olympic gold medallist (born 1870)
6 November – Hans Aall, librarian and museum director (born 1869).
11 November – Egill Reimers, architect, sailor and Olympic gold medallist (born 1878)
26 November – Ola Bertelsen, jurist and politician (born 1864)
13 December – Egil Eide, actor and director (born 1868)

Full date unknown
Gunnar Horn, petroleum geologist and Arctic explorer
Ambrotius Olsen Lindvig, politician and Minister (born 1855)

See also

References

External links